Francis Aidan Cardinal Gasquet  (born Francis Neil Gasquet; 5 October 1846 – 5 April 1929) was an English Benedictine monk and historical scholar. He was created Cardinal in 1914.

Life
Gasquet was the third of six children of Raymond Gasquet, a physician whose French naval officer father had emigrated to England during the British evacuation of Toulon in 1793. His mother was a Yorkshirewoman. He was born at 26 Euston Place, Somers Town, London.

Educated at Downside School, he entered the Benedictines in 1865 at Belmont Priory. He moved to Downside Abbey where he was professed and, on 19 December 1871, ordained a priest.  From 1878 to 1885 he was prior of Downside Abbey, resigning because of ill health.

Upon his recovery he became a member of the Pontifical Commission to study the validity of the Anglican ordinations (1896) leading to Apostolicae curae, to which his historical contribution was major. In 1900, he became abbot president of the English Benedictines.  He was President of the Pontifical Commission for Revision of the Vulgate, 1907. He also authored the major history of the Venerable English College at Rome.

He was created Cardinal-deacon in 1914 with the titular church of San Giorgio in Velabro. He was conferred the titular church of Santa Maria in Portico in 1915.
In 1917, he was appointed Archivist of the Vatican Secret Archives. In 1924, he was appointed Librarian of the Vatican Library. He died in Rome.

As a historian
Gasquet's historical work has been attacked by later writers. Geoffrey Elton wrote of "the falsehoods purveyed by Cardinal Gasquet and Hilaire Belloc". His collaboration with Edmund Bishop has been described as "an alliance between scholarship exquisite and deplorable". A polemical campaign by G. G. Coulton against Gasquet was largely successful in discrediting his works in academic eyes. One of his books contained an appendix "A Rough List of Misstatements and Blunders in Cardinal Gasquet's Writings.

David Knowles wrote a reasoned piece of apologetics on Gasquet's history in 1956, Cardinal Gasquet as an Historian. In it he speaks of Gasquet's "many errors and failings", and notes that he "was not an intellectually humble man and he showed little insight into his own limitations of knowledge and training". Coulton, though, he felt was in error, through over-simplifying the case.

Eamon Duffy said in an interview:

A biography, Cardinal Gasquet: a Memoir, (Burns & Oates 1953), was written by Shane Leslie, who knew him personally.

Works 
 A little book of prayers from Old English sources Catholic Truth Society, 1900.
 The Old English Bible and Other Essays, John C. Nimmo, 1897.
 Henry VIII and the English Monasteries, John Hodges, 1888.
 Edward VI and the Book of Common Prayer, John Hodges, 1890 (with Edmund Bishop).
 The Eve of the Reformation, G. Bell & Sons, 1923 [1st Pub. 1900].
 Parish Life in Mediæval England, Methuen & Co., 1922 [1st Pub. 1905].
 The Greater Abbeys of England, Chatto & Windus, 1908. (illustrated by Warwick Goble)
 The Last Abbot of Glastonbury and Other Essays, George Bell & Sons, 1908.
 The Black Death of 1348 and 1349, George Bell & Sons, 1908.
 A History of the Venerable English College, Rome, Longmans, Green & Co., 1920.
 Monastic Life in the Middle Ages, G. Bell & Sons, 1922.
 His Holiness Pope Pius XI, Daniel O'Connor, 1922.
 The Religious Life of King Henry VI, G. Bell & Sons, 1923.

Articles
 "Roger Bacon and the Latin Vulgate." In: A.G. Little (ed.), Roger Bacon Essays. Oxford: At the Clarendon Press, 1914.

Miscellany
 William M. Cunningham, The Unfolding of the Little Flower, with a Preface by Cardinal Gasquet. London: Kingscote Press, 1916.
 Father Stanislaus, Life of the Viscountess De Bonnault D'Houet, with an Introduction by Cardinal Gasquet. London: Longmans, Green & Co., 1916.

References

Further reading 

 Bellenger, Dom Aidan (2004). "Gasquet, Francis Neil (1846–1929)." In: Oxford Dictionary of National Biography. Oxford University Press.
 Benson, Robert Hugh (1914). "Cardinal Gasquet," The Dublin Review, Vol. CLV, pp. 125–130.
 Escourt, R. (1921). "The Work of Cardinal Gasquet in the Field of Pre-Reformation History," The American Catholic Quarterly Review, Vol. XLVI, No. 183, pp. 353–371.
 Grange, A. M. (1894). "Dom Gasquet as a Historian," The American Catholic Quarterly Review, Vol. XIX, No. 75, pp. 449–464.
 Guilday, Peter (1922). "Francis Aidan Cardinal Gasquet," The Catholic World, Vol. CXV, pp. 210–216.
Leslie, Shane (1953). Cardinal Gasquet, A Memoir. London: Burns, Oates. 
Knowles, David (1957). Cardinal Gasquet as an Historian. London: University of London, Athlone Press.
Jacob, E. F., Lewis Bernstein Namier, Theodore Frank Thomas Plucknett, Hugh Hale Bellot, W. K. Hancock, David Knowles, and John Goronwy Edwards (1952). The Creighton Lectures, 1951–57. London: University of London, Athlone Press.

External links

 Great Letter Writers
 Catholic Hierarchy entry
 
 
 
 

1846 births
1929 deaths
English Benedictines
English archivists
20th-century British cardinals
19th-century English historians
Italian archivists
English abbots
People educated at Downside School
Roman Catholic titular archbishops
Cardinals created by Pope Pius X
20th-century English historians
English people of French descent